New Blood is the ninth studio album by the English rock musician Peter Gabriel, released on 10 October 2011. The album consists of orchestral re-recordings of various tracks from Gabriel's career.

Background
The album continues the project Gabriel began with his previous album, Scratch My Back, which was orchestral covers of other artists' songs. The idea came about after rearranging Gabriel's songs for orchestra for the second half of shows on the Scratch My Back Tour of 2010. For this album Gabriel continued to work with arranger John Metcalfe. He originally planned to rerecord the songs with home-made instruments, but did not find the range and tone of expression available in existing instruments.

"I really didn't want to make this new album all about the hits," Gabriel explained to Mark Blake. "So there's no 'Sledgehammer'… I was unsure at first about 'Red Rain' and about doing 'Don't Give Up' without Kate, but then it felt like it would fit. In the end it worked."

The album features a new song, "A Quiet Moment", which originated in his desire to separate "Solsbury Hill" – remade due to huge demand – from the rest of the album. Originally three minutes of silence were to separate "Solsbury Hill", but it was thought this would confuse people, and Gabriel decided that "A Quiet Moment" would work better.

Reception

In The Independent, Andy Gill gave the album three stars out of five and commented, "The prevailing tones are of awed wonder – the aspirant nobility of Downside Up, the dancing woodwind of San Jacinto and In Your Eyes – or expectant tension, most notably in the emotional storm-surges of Red Rain and The Rhythm of the Heat."

Writing for the Evening Standard, Pete Clark awarded the album four stars out of five and stated, "In typical Gabriel fashion obvious choices have been avoided: no Sledgehammer or Biko here. Instead, he and arranger/composer John Metcalfe have opted for songs that might best benefit from the grown-up treatment. Mostly, it is a great success."

In The Word, David Hepworth stated the album was more successful than Scratch My Back, writing "John Metcalfe's stern string arrangements frame the drama of songs like San Jacinto, In Your Eyes and Red Rain, though there is a tendency for any rhythmic strings to sound like Bernard Hermann soundtracks to Hitchcock movies. Good for an open-topped car ride across the Yorkshire Dales while you're playing hide and seek with the sun."

Track listing

Bonus tracks

Personnel
 Peter Gabriel – production, arrangement
 John Metcalfe – production, arrangement, mixing, orchestration
 Richard Chappell – mixing, engineering
 Scott Barnett – additional engineering
 Mark Claydon – additional engineering
 Steve Orchard – Air Lyndhurst sessions recording
 Olga Fitzroy – Air Lyndhurst sessions recording assistant, Pro Tools editor
 Fiona Cruickshank – Pro Tools editor assistant
 Melanie Gabriel – vocals ("Downside Up")
 Ane Brun – vocals ("Don't Give Up")
 Tom Cawley – vocals
 New Blood Orchestra – orchestra performance
 Tony Cousins – mastering
 Marc Bessant – design
 Steve Gschmeissner – cover photograph

Charts

Weekly charts

Year-end charts

References

External links

2011 albums
Peter Gabriel albums
Real World Records albums
Virgin Records albums
Albums recorded at AIR Studios